Sheppard Point is a point marking the north side of the entrance to Hope Bay, at the northeast end of Antarctic Peninsula. It was discovered by a party under J. Gunnar Andersson of the Swedish Antarctic Expedition, 1901–04, who wintered at Hope Bay in 1903. It was named by the Falkland Islands Dependencies Survey (FIDS) for Robert Carl Sheppard, master mariner of two ships, Eagle (1944–1945) and Trepassey (1945–1946), chartered for the secret British Antarctic expedition Operation Tabarin.

Headlands of Trinity Peninsula